Euaspa is a genus of butterflies in the family Lycaenidae. They are found in the Indomalayan realm ranging from the Himalayas to Vietnam. They feed on  oaks (Quercus spp.).

Species
Euaspa ziha (Hewitson, 1865) – white-spotted hairstreak Himalayas
Euaspa milionia (Hewitson, 1869) – water hairstreak
Euaspa forsteri (Esaki & Shirôzu, 1943) Taiwan and (E. f. ueharai) Laos
Euaspa tayal (Esaki & Shirôzu, 1943) Taiwan
Euaspa pavo (de Nicéville, 1887) – peacock hairstreak North India, Bhutan, Assam, Laos, Myanmar
Euaspa hishikawai Koiwaya, 2002 Laos
Euaspa mikamii Koiwaya, 2002 Northeast India
Euaspa minaei Monastryskii & Devyatkin, 2003 Vietnam
Euaspa miyashitai Koiwaya, 2002 Northeast India
Euaspa motokii Koiwaya, 2002 Myanmar
Euaspa nishimurai Koiwaya, 2002 Vietnam
Euaspa nosei Koiwaya, 2002 Myanmar
Euaspa uedai Koiwaya, 2014 China (Sichuan)
Euaspa zhengi Huang, 2016 China (Xizang Autonomous Region)

References

Theclini
Lycaenidae genera